Hull Bay is an ice-filled bay, about  wide, fed by Hull Glacier, which descends into it between Lynch Point and Cape Burks, on the coast of Marie Byrd Land, Antarctica. It was discovered by the United States Antarctic Service, 1939–41. The bay derives its name from Hull Glacier, which was named for U.S. Secretary of State Cordell Hull.

References

Bays of Marie Byrd Land